False is the second studio album by Dutch death metal band Gorefest. It was released in 1992 via Nuclear Blast.

Track listing

Personnel
Gorefest
 Jan-Chris de Koeijer – vocals, bass
 Frank Harthoorn – guitar
 Boudewijn Bonebakker – guitar
 Ed Warby – drums

Production
 Hannah Bear – photography
 Mid – cover art
 Repro Desaster – artwork (cover realization)
 Markus Staiger – executive producer
 Pete Coleman – engineering, mixing
 Colin Richardson – engineering, producer, recording
 Ton Homans – photography

References 

1992 albums
Gorefest albums
Nuclear Blast albums